Independence High School (IHS) is a public high school located in Glendale, Arizona, United States, and is the most recent high school in the Glendale Union High School District. The school's name was picked by the school board because of the bicentennial observance.  The school was scheduled to open in the summer of 1976, but was postponed due to construction and lack of demand from the district's student population. It opened during the 1977–1978 school year under principal Fed McClure.  The initial enrollment was 420 students consisting of freshman and sophomore students only. The first graduating class was in 1980.  The school celebrated its thirtieth anniversary during the 2007–2008 school year.

The school was designed by the local architecture firm Varney, Sexton, Sydnor Associates and built in the Brutalist style.

Two weeks after the school opened, a fire broke out destroying parts of the lower level, however classes resumed a few days later.  A formal dedication was held on November 17, 1977, with the Honorable Bob Stump, representative, as guest speaker.

On February 12, 2016, the school was the site of a murder suicide shooting that killed two 15-year-old girls.

Ethnic diversity 

Independence's ethnic diversity as of January 2008 was:

 Asian: 45 (2.68%)
 American Indian/Alaskan: 25 (1.4%)
 African American: 239 (14.26%)
 Hispanic: 968 (57.79%)
 White: 398 (23.76%)

References

External links
 

Educational institutions established in 1977
Public high schools in Arizona
Education in Glendale, Arizona
Schools in Maricopa County, Arizona
1977 establishments in Arizona